Naomi Grossman (born February 6, 1975) is an American actress, writer, and producer best known for her role as Pepper in the second and fourth season of the FX horror television series American Horror Story.

Early life
Grossman was born in Denver, Colorado. In her early life, she performed in community theatre shows. She received a lot of attention at Ponderosa High School, in Parker, Colorado, at their theatre program. After attending high school. She was a Rotary Youth Exchange Student in Argentina, she attended and graduated from Northwestern University with a theater major, as the only university she applied to. She was a member of improvisational and sketch comedy troupe The Groundlings in Los Angeles, California, and wanted to ultimately perform on Saturday Night Live. When the group cut ties with her, she began teaching the Spanish language and separating herself from her acting career. Grossman writes and produces and has cited Lily Tomlin, Tracey Ullman, Gilda Radner and Carol Burnett as inspirations.

Career
Grossman began her career in 1990 with minor television roles, along with commercial and theatre appearances.

Not knowing what role she was auditioning for, Grossman sent in an audition for American Horror Story: Asylum in mid-2012 and was cast in soon after as Pepper, a woman with microcephaly; the season premiered later that year on October 17. In preparation for the role, she shaved her head bald. In 2014, it was revealed that Grossman would return to the series in its fourth season, American Horror Story: Freak Show, reprising her role as Pepper from the second season, making her the first to play the same role in two different seasons of the show. She spoke of her casting in the fourth season saying that reprising her role was "the last thing from [her] mind" since it had never been done before.

Filmography

Film

Television

References

External links

21st-century American actresses
American television actresses
Northwestern University School of Communication alumni
Actresses from Denver
20th-century American actresses
American film actresses
1975 births
Living people